Central Girls Football Academy is a women's football team based in Grangemouth, Central Scotland.

From 2018, they have been members of the Scottish Women's Premier League (SWPL), the highest level women's football league in Scotland. They currently compete in its second tier, SWPL2, having won the third-tier Scottish Women's Football League Division 1 North in 2017. The club's motto is "Imagine, Believe, Achieve".

Central also have a team that play in the fourth tier of Scottish women's football in the SWFL2 Central league. The SWFL team play their home games at Inchyra Park, Grangemouth.

History

Foundation
The club was founded by football coach Ian Dibdin. In the early 2000s, whilst working within youth development at Falkirk Football Club under Ian McCall, Dibdin was invited to work on expanding the Falkirk girls section. Under this initiative, Dibdin designed and set up women's programs for Falkirk and Stenhousemuir football clubs. In January 2014, Dibdin founded Central Girls Football Academy.

2015–2017
In 2015 the team won the SWFL Division 2 Central and were promoted to the SWFL Division 1 North.

On 5 November 2017, Central beat Inverness 6–0 to win the SWFL North league and gain promotion to the SWPL2 for the 2018 season. Central won 17 of their 18 league games, scoring 102 goals and conceding only 18 during the campaign.

2018 (SWPL 2)
During the 2018 SWPL launch, captain Ellie Kane intimated Central intended to challenge for that years SWPL2 title. On 11 February, Central began the campaign with a 3–1 win away to St Johnstone.

In April 2018, Central midfielder, Chelsea McEachran won the first SWPL Player of the Month award of 2018 for February/March at only 15 years of age.

In July 2018, Central captain Ellie Kane and midfielder Kim McAlpine left the club to take up university scholarships in the United States. Both spoke highly of Central coach Ian Dibdin with McAlpine stating she hoped to return to Central after her four-year scholarship to Carson–Newman University, Tennessee. Kane left for University of South Alabama, also on a four-year scholarship.

Youth and development
The club has had considerable success at youth level, winning many titles.

In 2014 the Central Under-14 team won the UK Championships. In 2015, the Central Under-15 team won the  Scottish Cup when they beat Glasgow City 5–0. In 2016 the team won UK Championships again at Under-16 and Under-17 level.

Eight players of the 2017 SWFL winning team played in and won the Under-14 UK Championship in July 2014.

In July 2018 Central won the Under-15 UK Championship. The win gave Central a UK Championship haul with titles at U14, U15, U16 & U17 level. Later in the same month, the under-15 team also won the Home International Coalfields Cup held in Kelty, Fife. The team beat Boroughmuir Thistle 3–1 in the final, on 30 July 2018.

Matchday programme
The Central Girls Football Academy SWPL Match Day programme is called View from the Centre. 
Each edition contains match reports, player profiles, league updates and opposition news.

Current squad

Personnel

Honours

References

External links 
 
 Soccerway profile

2014 establishments in Scotland
Association football clubs established in 2014
Scottish Women's Premier League clubs
Sport in Falkirk
Women's football clubs in Scotland
Football academies in Scotland
Scottish Women's Football League clubs